György Brankovics is an 1874 Hungarian opera by Ferenc Erkel. It is based on the life of György Brankovics.

References
The following sources were given:
 Till Géza: Opera, Zeneműkiadó, Budapest, 1985, 
 Winkler Gábor: Barangolás az operák világában, Tudomány Kiadó, Budapest, 2005, 

Hungarian-language operas
Operas by Ferenc Erkel
1874 operas
Operas